Alexis Egea Acame (born 25 December 1987), simply known as Alexis, is a Spanish professional footballer who plays for CF Intercity as a central defender.

Club career
Born in Alicante, Valencia, Egea made his senior debuts with Torrellano Illice CF in the 2008–09 campaign, in the regional leagues. In 2011, he appeared during the whole pre-season with Elche CF, being later assigned to the reserves.

Alexis left the Franjiverdes in the 2012 summer, and signed for Estudiantes de Altamira on 3 January of the following year. He made his professional debut on the 12th, starting in a 3–3 away draw against Club Necaxa.

On 10 August 2013 Alexis returned to Spain, signing a one-year deal with CD Torrevieja. On 13 May 2015 he moved to Guatemalan club Universidad SC, and subsequently represented Víkingur Ólafsvík (two stints) and CD Almoradí.

Personal life
Alexis' father Sergio, was also a footballer and a defender. His brother, Lauren, is a forward.

References

External links

1987 births
Living people
People from Alicante
Spanish footballers
Footballers from the Valencian Community
Association football defenders
Tercera División players
Elche CF Ilicitano footballers
CD Torrevieja players
Ungmennafélagið Víkingur players
Spanish expatriate footballers
Spanish expatriate sportspeople in Mexico
Spanish expatriate sportspeople in Guatemala
Spanish expatriate sportspeople in Iceland
Expatriate footballers in Mexico
Expatriate footballers in Guatemala
Expatriate footballers in Iceland